Washington Park Historic District, also known as the Southside Neighborhood, is a national historic district located at Winston-Salem, Forsyth County, North Carolina.  The district encompasses 348 contributing buildings, 1 contributing site (Washington Park), and 2 contributing structures, in a predominantly residential section of Winston-Salem.  It was a planned speculative development centered on a streetcar line. The buildings date from about 1892 to 1940, and include notable examples of Colonial Revival, Queen Anne, and Bungalow / American Craftsman style architecture.  Notable buildings include the Schlatter Memorial Reformed Church (1916).

It was listed on the National Register of Historic Places in 1992.

References

Historic districts on the National Register of Historic Places in North Carolina
Colonial Revival architecture in North Carolina
Queen Anne architecture in North Carolina
Buildings and structures in Winston-Salem, North Carolina
National Register of Historic Places in Winston-Salem, North Carolina